Aulacodes aechmialis is a moth in the family Crambidae. It was described by Achille Guenée in 1854. It is found in Panama, Honduras, Guatemala, Grenada and French Guiana.

References

Acentropinae
Moths described in 1854
Moths of Central America
Moths of the Caribbean